Even A. Røed (born 23 February 1992) is a Norwegian politician.

He was elected representative to the Storting from the constituency of Buskerud for the period 2021–2025, for the Labour Party.

Educated from the University of Oslo, Røed worked as teacher in Kongsberg since 2018. Hailing from Veggli in the municipality of Rollag, he was a member of the municipal council of Rollag from 2011 to 2018, and of the municipal council of Kongsberg since 2019. He was deputy representative to the Storting 2017–2021.

References

1992 births
Living people
University of Oslo alumni
Labour Party (Norway) politicians
Buskerud politicians
Members of the Storting